David Patiño (born 6 September 1967) is a Mexican former professional footballer and manager. He obtained a total number of 28 caps for the Selección de fútbol de México (Mexico national team) between 1993 and 1996, and was a squad member at the 1993 Copa América. He made his debut on 10 February 1993.

Career
Born in Mexico City, Patiño played professional football for five clubs during his career. He played for UNAM from 1986 to 1993, where he would win the 1990–91 Mexican Primera División title and the 1989 CONCACAF Champions' Cup. He also won a Mexican Primera División title with C.F. Pachuca in 1999. In 1997, he played for the Colorado Rapids of Major League Soccer, where he helped the club reach the 1997 MLS Cup.

After he retired from playing, Patiño became a football coach.  He was appointed manager of Mexican Primera División side Monarcas Morelia in 2007, and has managed several lower division clubs, including Santos Laguna B, Morelia B, Mérida and Neza. He signed a one-year deal to manage Veracruz in May 2012. However, he was fired during the Apertura 2012 tournament, and was appointed manager of Pumas Morelos in December 2012. He is now coach for the pumas U.N.A.M 1st division team.

Managerial Statistics

Managerial Statistics

International goals

|-  
| 1. || June 20, 1993 || Estadio George Capwell, Guayaquil, Ecuador ||  || 1–1 || Draw || 1993 Copa América
|-  
| 2. || June 27, 1993 || Estadio Olímpico Atahualpa, Quito, Ecuador ||  || 4–2 || Win || 1993 Copa América
|- 
| 3. || October 6, 1993 || Los Angeles Memorial Coliseum, Los Angeles, United States ||  || 4–0 || Win || Friendly
|- 
| 4. || May 18, 1996 || Soldier Field, Chicago, United States ||  || 5–2 || Win || Friendly
|}

Honours

Player
UNAM
 Mexican Primera División: 1990–91
 CONCACAF Champions' Cup: 1989

Pachuca
 Mexican Primera División: Invierno 1999

Manager
Mérida
 Primera División A: Clausura 2009

Notes

References

External links

1967 births
Living people
Mexico international footballers
Mexico under-20 international footballers
Association football forwards
Club Universidad Nacional footballers
Major League Soccer players
C.F. Monterrey players
Colorado Rapids players
C.F. Pachuca players
Liga MX players
1993 Copa América players
Mexican football managers
Atlético Morelia managers
C.D. Veracruz managers
Footballers from Mexico City
Toros Neza footballers
Mexican expatriate footballers
Mexican footballers
Expatriate soccer players in the United States
Mexican expatriate sportspeople in the United States
Liga MX managers